Edward McDaniel (born March 23, 1969) is a former American football linebacker in the National Football League (NFL). He was drafted by the Minnesota Vikings, 5th round (125th overall) of the 1992 Draft. He spent his entire professional career with the Minnesota Vikings.

References

1969 births
Living people
American football linebackers
Clemson Tigers football players
Clemson University alumni
Minnesota Vikings players
National Conference Pro Bowl players
People from Batesburg-Leesville, South Carolina